Note: much of this article derives from a hagiographical press-release promoting Garlawolu's presidential candidacy

Francis Y.S. Garlawolu (sometimes seen as "Garlawulo," "Galawolu" or "Galawulo"), (born  1951) is a Liberian politician and attorney.

Origins
Garlawolu was born to Mr. Flomo Garlawolu and Madam Towin Var Garlawolu in the small village of Garlawoluta, then Jorquelleh District (now Yellequelleh District), Bong County, Republic of Liberia.

Legal and political career
After completing his studies at the University of Liberia in the 1970s, Garlawolu began working as an attorney on human rights cases in Liberia. He successfully defended poor people, labor unions, and opposition groups in the 1980s.  Garlawolu passed the Bar Examinations, and was admitted to the Supreme Court Bar in 1983.

He holds several awards including the Albent Award for the democratization of Liberian society.  In 1984, Garlawolu served as a Deputy Trial Counsel of the Supreme Military Tribunal with the rank of captain. 
 
In 1990, when the Country was divided by the Civil war, Garlawolu founded a national movement for the protection of civilian rights. This organization was known as the concerned citizen movement of Liberia. He was its National Chairman.

He attended all the peace conferences from Africa to Europe, which led to the formation of a government of National Unity, in which he became the first Attorney General and Minister of Justice in 1996.

In 1997, he was elected as Senior Senator of Bong County and chaired the Senate Standing Committee on Judiciary & Human Rights. Following the dethroning of the Taylor-led-government, Garlawolu was unanimously elected as member of the National Transitional Legislative Assembly in 2003. 
 
Garlawolu was unanimously elected by his Colleagues to chair the Judiciary Committee - which Committee he still chairs.

Garlawolu is a member of the International Criminal Law Network based in The Hague with the rights of a defense Counsel. He is accredited to practice before the International Criminal Court & International Court of Justice.

In 2003, Garlawolu filed a case on behalf of the Liberian Government against the Government of Sierra Leone before the International Court of Justice. He also represented ex-president Charles G. Taylor before the Special Court in Sierra Leone.  He has represented Charles Taylor's wife in divorce proceedings.

Garlawolu takes credit for building schools, a clinic, and a church in Bong County. He is married to Mrs. Serena F. Garlawolu, who has been described as a civil rights activist and a humanitarian.  Mrs. Garlawolu, a Senior Student at the Louis Author Grimes School of Law, University of Liberia, is the Consul General for South Korea in Liberia.

Garlawolu is the author of two books: "The Liberian Civil War and Efforts for Peace" and "The Abandoned Child." The latter is used as literature for the 9th grade class of the Liberian School System.

2005 presidential election
Garlawolu, as a Constitutional Lawyer, represented the Grand Coalition of political parties before the Supreme Court of Liberia in 1986. The Grand Coalition was founded by five political parties against the then ruling party, the National Democratic Party of Liberia. Upon hearing that the Coalition had scheduled a mass Rally at the Coconut Plantation Beach of Monrovia, the Government of Liberia filed a petition for a writ of prohibition against the holding of the rally. The Leaders of these parties (Unity Party, Liberia Unification Party, LAC & United People's Party) were arrested and detained. Garlawolu represented them.

He has represented most of the individuals and political parties seeking participation in the upcoming elections.

Garlawolu at one point intended to be a presidential candidate on the ticket of the National Patriotic Party (NPP), and declared that he hoped to win more than 75% of the votes in the October, 2005 presidential elections.  When the list of 22 accepted presidential candidates was announced by the National Election Commission in August 2005, however, Garlawolu's name was not on the list. Reports suggest that he lost the NPP primary to Dr. Roland Massaquoi.

"Get Informed International"
Garlawolu accepted the U.S.-based company Get Informed International, Inc.'s proposal for establishing and implementing an economic development platform in Liberia as the basis for the economic aspect of his campaign and as the economic platform that would have been implemented upon his election.  Garlawolu also appointed Get Informed International, Inc. as his official presidential advisor in all economic issues as well as other issues in the best interests of the growth and development of Liberia.

Get Informed International's officers were involved in the U.S. branch of Garlawolu's election campaign.  Get Informed International's Chief Executive Officer and Chief Financial Officer are also committee managers in the Nuwaubian Trust Freedom Network  which is working for the release of Malachi Z. York from an American prison.  Senator Garlawolu was reported as assisting in this effort.

External links
 Statement by Francis Garlawolu to the World Conference on Racism, 2001

Living people
University of Liberia alumni
People from Bong County
1951 births
National Patriotic Party politicians
Justice ministers of Liberia
Attorneys general of Liberia